Matteo Bachini (born 24 May 1995) is an Italian professional footballer who plays as a centre back for  club Lucchese.

Club career
Born in Pontedera, Bachini started his career in Empoli youth sector, and was promoted to the first team for the 2014–15 season. He was loaned to Serie C club Lucchese, and he made his professional debut on 14 September 2014 against Savona.

He left Empoli on 2 February 2015, and signed with Tuttocuoio on Serie C.

On 6 July 2017, he joined to Juve Stabia.

The next year, on 13 September 2018 he signed with Spezia. At the middle of the season, on 8 January 2019 he was loaned to Piacenza.

On 3 September 2020, he joined to Vibonese.

In 2021. he signed with Lucchese.

References

External links
 
 

1995 births
Living people
People from Pontedera
Sportspeople from the Province of Pisa
Italian footballers
Association football central defenders
Serie C players
Empoli F.C. players
Lucchese 1905 players
A.C. Tuttocuoio 1957 San Miniato players
S.S. Juve Stabia players
Spezia Calcio players
Piacenza Calcio 1919 players
F.C. Arzignano Valchiampo players
A.S.D. Sicula Leonzio players
U.S. Vibonese Calcio players
Footballers from Tuscany